Labastide-Gabausse is a commune in the Tarn department and Occitanie region of southern France.

See also
Communes of the Tarn department

References

Communes of Tarn (department)